Kim Na-young (Hangul: 김나영; born 3 August 1995) is a South Korean badminton player. She made a debut in the international tournament in 2013, and was selected to join the national team in 2014. Kim who was educated at the Hwasun High School, was part of the national junior team that won the mixed team title and grabbed the Suhandinata Cup at the 2013 World Junior Championships, and also won the silver medal at the Asian Junior Championships. Kim now plays for the Samsung Electro-Mechanics, and educated at the Dankook University.

Achievements

BWF International Challenge/Series 
Women's singles

  BWF International Challenge tournament
  BWF International Series tournament
  BWF Future Series tournament

References

External links 
 

1995 births
Living people
People from Suncheon
South Korean female badminton players
Sportspeople from South Jeolla Province